Marcel Hernández Campanioni (born 11 July 1989) is a Cuban professional footballer who plays as a centre-forward for Costa Rican club Cartaginés and the Cuba national team.

Club career

Barcelona Atlético
On 10 January 2017. Hernández signed with the new champion team of Liga Dominicana de Fútbol side Barcelona Atlético.

Cibao
Before failing to join the Football Superleague of Kosovo side Trepça'89, he joined Liga Dominicana de Fútbol side Cibao.

Failure to join with Trepça'89
On 23 December 2017. Hernández joined Football Superleague of Kosovo side Trepça'89, but because of some bureaucratic problems it could not join with Trepça'89 even though it is registered by Football Federation of Kosovo as Trepça'89 player and it is expected that during the summer transfer window to join the team.

International career

Under-23
On 25 June 2011. Hernández making his debut with Cuba U23 in a 2012 CONCACAF Men's Pre-Olympic Tournament qualification match against Aruba U23 after being named in the starting line-up and scoring two goals during a 7–0 home win.

Senior
On 10 November 2010. Hernández made his debut with Cuba in a 2010 Caribbean Cup qualification match against Dominica after being named in the starting line-up and scoring one goal during a 4–2 home win. He represented his country in 4 FIFA World Cup qualification matches

On 6 November 2013, he announced his retirement from international football after not was named as part of the Cuba squad for 2013 CONCACAF Gold Cup.

Senior international goals
Scores and results list Cuba's goal tally first.

|-
| 1. ||||Antigua Recreation Ground, St. John's, Antigua and Barbuda||||align=center|4–1||align=center|4–2||2010 Caribbean Cup qualification
|-
| 2. ||||rowspan=2 valign="center"|Estadio Pedro Marrero, Havana, Cuba||rowspan=2 valign="center"|||align=center|1–1||align=center|1–1||rowspan=2 valign="center"|Friendly
|-
| 3. ||||align=center|1–0||align=center|2–1
|-
| 4. ||rowspan=4 valign="center"|||rowspan=4 valign="center"|Dwight Yorke Stadium, Bacolet, Trinidad and Tobago||rowspan=4 valign="center"|||align=center|1–0 ||rowspan=4 align="center"|5–0||rowspan=4 valign="center"|2012 Caribbean Cup qualification
|-
| 5. ||align=center|2–0
|-
| 6. ||align=center|4–0
|-
| 7. ||align=center|5–0
|-
| 8. ||||Antigua Recreation Ground, St. John's, Antigua and Barbuda||||align=center|1–0||align=center|1–0||2012 Caribbean Cup
|-
| 9. ||rowspan=2 valign="center"|||rowspan=2 valign="center"|FFB Stadium, Belmopan, Belize||rowspan=2 valign="center"|||align=center|1–0 ||rowspan=2 align="center"|3–0||rowspan=2 valign="center"|Friendly
|-
| 10. ||align=center|3–0
|}

Honours
Alajuelense
 CONCACAF League: 2020

Cuba
 Caribbean Cup: 2012

Individual
 Liga FPD Top Scorer: Apertura 2020

References

External links

1989 births
Living people
Sportspeople from Havana
Cuban footballers
Cuba youth international footballers
Cuba international footballers
2011 CONCACAF Gold Cup players
Cuban expatriate footballers
Expatriate footballers in Antigua and Barbuda
Cuban expatriate sportspeople in Antigua and Barbuda
Expatriate footballers in the Dominican Republic
Cuban expatriate sportspeople in the Dominican Republic
Expatriate footballers in Costa Rica
Cuban expatriate sportspeople in Costa Rica
Association football midfielders
FC Ciudad de La Habana players
Hoppers F.C. players
Moca FC players
Club Barcelona Atlético players
Cibao FC players
C.S. Cartaginés players
Liga Dominicana de Fútbol players
Antigua and Barbuda Premier Division players
Liga FPD players
L.D. Alajuelense footballers